College of Agriculture may refer to:

College of Agriculture, Latur, India
College of Agriculture, Pantnagar, India
College of Agriculture (Khorramabad), Iran
College of Agriculture, Hormozgan, Iran
College of Agriculture in Gonbad, Iran